Count Przemysław Potocki (1805–1847) was a Polish nobleman (szlachcic).

He was married to Princess Teresa Sapieha since 1830. They had five children together: Roza Marianna Potocka, Idalia Potocka, Pelagia Potocka, Stanisław Antoni Potocki and Antoni Potocki.

1805 births
1847 deaths
Counts of Poland
Przemyslaw